Ohio (minor planet designation: 439 Ohio) is a large Main belt asteroid.

It was discovered by E. F. Coddington on October 13, 1898, at Mount Hamilton, California. It was first of his total of three asteroid discoveries. The object is named for the U.S. state of Ohio.

References

External links
 
 

Background asteroids
Ohio
Ohio
X:-type asteroids (Tholen)
18981013